Rokia Doumbia (born 5 May 1999) is a Malian basketball player for Purdue Boilermakers and the Malian national team.

She represented Mali at the 2019 Women's Afrobasket.

References

External links

1999 births
Living people
Arkansas Razorbacks women's basketball players
Centers (basketball)
Malian women's basketball players
Purdue Boilermakers women's basketball players
Sportspeople from Bradenton, Florida
21st-century Malian people